The green-naped tanager (Tangara fucosa) is a species of bird in the family Thraupidae. It is found in Colombia and Panama. Its natural habitat is subtropical or tropical moist montane forests. It is threatened by habitat loss.

References

green-naped tanager
Birds of Panama
Birds of Colombia
Birds of the Tumbes-Chocó-Magdalena
green-naped tanager
Taxonomy articles created by Polbot